John Ingram Pitt (13 March 1937 – 23 March 2022) was an Australian mycologist, known as a leading expert on the role of fungi in food spoilage. He gained an international reputation as a pioneering researcher on the ecology of spoilage moulds in extreme environments, especially dried fruits, and other dried foodstuffs.

Education and career
John I. Pitt was born and grew up on a small farm near Wamberal, New South Wales. After attending Gosford High School, he moved to Sydney. There on 1 March 1954 he became an employee of the Australian Government's Commonwealth Scientific and Industrial Research Organisation (CSIRO). He began at CSIRO as a Technical Assistant Grade 1 (Junior), was slowly but steadily promoted over many years, and was appointed a Chief Research Scientist in 1992 when he reached the age of 55. At the time of his death in 2022, he was the only CSIRO employee in its history to start at the lowest research employment grade and to go through all of the research grades up to the highest level. He retired from CSIRO in 2002.

After joining CSIRO in 1954 he became a part-time student at the University of New South Wales (UNSW), where he studied food technology. At UNSW he completed a seven-year course of study in eight years, followed by an M.Sc. qualifying course, and then a part-time M.Sc. program. His 1965 M.Sc. thesis is entitled Microbiological Problems in Prune Preservation. On leave of absence from CSIRO, he became in 1965 a graduate student at the University of California, Davis. He graduated there with a Ph.D. in 1968. His Ph.D. thesis (on the taxonomy of Metschnikowia) is entitled The yeast genus Metschnikowia. His thesis advisor was Martin Wesley Miller (1925–2005) in the UC Davis department of food science and technology. After completing his Ph.D., Pitt spent a postdoctoral year at the USDA's Northern Regional Research Laboratory (NRRL), where his supervisor was Clifford William Hesseltine (1917–1999). At the USDA Pitt studied Penicillium taxonomy and mycotoxin occurrences in food chains. When his postdoctoral fellowship ended, he returned to CSIRO and wrote a paper with John H. B. Christian.

Michael Vincent Tracey, who was the Chief of the CSIRO Division of Food Research from 1967 to 1978, asked Pitt to systematically monitor the mycotoxins threatening food safety. Pitt used many fungal cultures obtained from NRRL during his postdoctoral fellowship to establish at CSIRO a yeast and mould collection, which by the year 2021 had about 6000 specimens. The fungal collection is officially known as the FRR culture collection and has major importance in food and industrial applications. The FRR culture collection is particularly strong in Penicillium and Aspergillus species and their related teleomorphs. The collection contains what might be the world's most comprehensive collection of xerophilic fungi. The collection is the basis for Pitt's book The Genus Penicillium and its teleomorphic States Eupenicillium and Talaromyces (Academic Press, 1980) and the book Fungi and Food Spoilage (Academic Press, 1985), coauthored by Ailsa Diane Hocking. The book extensively describes fungal species that cause spoilage of fruits and vegetables, as well as fungal species implicated in spoilage of dairy foods, meats, cereals, nuts, and oilseeds. By 2023 Fungi and Food Spoilage went through 4 editions and was cited over 5800 times.

From the 1970s to 1990s, Pitt and Hocking did pioneering research on methods for isolating and identifying foodborne fungi, as well as their physiology and ecology. The main focus of the research was on xerophilic fungi. Pitt and Hocking did research for the Australian Centre for International Agricultural Research (ACIAR) on the fungi and mycotoxins that occur in food commodities from Indonesia and Southeast Asia. Pitt became a leading authority on the specific fungi that produce specific mycotoxins. In the 1980s he investigated the role of the environment in problems with aflatoxin in peanuts grown in Australia. He pioneered biocontrol by competitive exclusion (replacing toxigenic fungal strains by non-toxigenic fungal strains) for controlling aflatoxin formation in peanuts and maize. Pitt with three collaborators discovered in 1986 the species Aspergillus pisci (called by them Polypaecilum pisce).

Pitt was the author or coauthor of many papers related to the ecology of moulds that cause food spoilage. He, with his frequent collaborator Ailsa D. Hocking, did research on how to prevent food spoilage caused by the fungi genera Aspergillus, Penicillium, and Cladosporium and the yeast species Zygosaccharomyces bailii 

Pitt was the author, coauthor, editor, or co-editor of 20 books. He was the author or coauthor of about 250 research papers or book chapters. In 2019 his Google Scholar h-index exceeded 60.

Pitt was honoured with three Honorary Life Memberships: from the Australian Society from Microbiology in 2000, from the Mycological Society of America in 2001, and from the British Mycological Society in 2003. He won several awards, most notably the	Commonwealth of Australia's Centenary Medal with citation for “services to food science and technology”.

Selected publications

Articles

Books
 
  
 )

References

1937 births
2022 deaths
Australian mycologists
Food scientists
University of New South Wales alumni
University of California, Davis alumni
CSIRO people
People from the Central Coast (New South Wales)
Recipients of the Centenary Medal